Yasmeen Khan may refer to:
 Yasmeen Khan (cricketer)
 Yasmeen Khan (actress)

See also
 Yasmin Khan (disambiguation)